The men's 20 kilometres competition of the 2014 Winter Paralympics was held at Laura Biathlon & Ski Complex near Krasnaya Polyana, Sochi. The sitting 15 km competition took place on 9 March 2014 and the standing and visually impaired competition took place on 10 March 2014.

Medal table

Standing

Sitting (15km)

Visually Impaired

See also
Cross-country skiing at the 2014 Winter Olympics

References

Men's 20 km Free